Sumer Singh Gardi was a Gardi guard of the Peshwas. He is mainly known for his involvement in the assassination of Peshwa Narayanrao in 1773, where he led several Gardis and brutally killed Narayanrao. The assassination was performed on the orders of Raghunathrao, whose message was intercepted by his wife Anandibai.

Assassination of Narayanrao 

According to popular legend, Raghunathrao had sent a message to Sumer Singh Gardi to fetch Narayanrao using the Marathi word dharaa (धरा) or 'hold' (actual phrase in Marathi - " नारायणरावांना धरा"/"Narayanrao-ana dhara"). This message was intercepted by his wife Anandibai who changed a single letter to make it read as maaraa (मारा) or 'kill' . The miscommunication led the Gardis to chase Narayanrao, who, upon hearing them coming, started running towards his uncles' residence screaming, "Kaka! Mala Vachva!!" ("Uncle! Save me!"). But nobody came to help him and he was killed in the presence of his uncle.

Death 
Sumer Singh Gardi died mysteriously at Patna in 1775.

References 

 Shripad Rama Sharma (1951). The Making of Modern India: From A. D. 1526 to the Present Day. Orient Longmans. p. 302
 S.Venugopala Rao (1977). power and criminality. Allied Publishers Pvt Limited. pp. 111–121.
 Govind Sakharam Sardesai (1968). New History of the Marathas: Sunset over Maharashtra (1772-1848). Phoenix Publications. p. 27. Thus within the short space of about half an hour eleven persons came to be murdered in cold blood in that famous palace, seven being Brahmans, two Maratha servants, two maids.

1775 deaths
Date of birth missing
Place of birth missing
Assassins of heads of government
Indian assassins
People of the Maratha Empire
18th-century Asian people